Rebel Heart is the third studio album by American country music artist Dan Seals, released in 1983 viaLiberty Records. This was also his first album to appear on the charts, reaching #40 on the Top Country Albums chart. He achieved his first top ten single with the song, "God Must Be a Cowboy". The other singles released from the album were "Everybody's Dream Girl" (#18), "After You" (#28), and "You Really Go for the Heart" (#37).

Track listing

Personnel 
 Dan Seals – lead and backing vocals, acoustic guitar 
 Bobby Thompson – acoustic guitar 
 Rafe Van Hoy – acoustic guitar, electric guitar 
 Steve Gibson – electric guitar 
 Dann Huff – electric guitar 
 John Porter McMeans – electric guitar 
 Fred Newell – electric guitar 
 Reggie Young – electric guitar 
 Doyle Grisham – steel guitar
 Shane Keister – keyboards, synthesizers 
 Bobby Ogdin – keyboards
 David Hungate – bass 
 Jack Williams – bass
 Larrie Londin – drums 
 James Stroud – drums 
 Buddy Spicher – fiddle 
 Sherri Huffman – backing vocals (5)
 Lisa Silver – backing vocals (5)
 Diane Tidwell – backing vocals (5)

Production 
 Producer and Mixing – Kyle Lehning 
 Engineer – Joseph Bogan 
 Mastered by John Eberle
 Art Direction – Henry Marquez 
 Design – Amy Nagasawa
 Photography – Jennifer Griffiths

Chart performance

Album

Singles

1983 albums
Dan Seals albums
Liberty Records albums
Albums produced by Kyle Lehning